Here is a list of all local administrative units (localități; sing. localitate), which are the municipalities (municipii; sing. municipiu), cities (orașe; sing. oraș) and communes (comune; sing. comună) of Romania, grouped by macroregions (macroregiune; sing. macroregiunea), development regions (regiunile de dezvoltare; sing. regiunea de dezvoltare) and counties (județe; sing. județ).

Macroregiunea 1

North-West Romania

Bihor County
4 municipalities, 6 towns and 91 communes
Municipalities

Beiuș
Marghita
Oradea - capital
Salonta

Towns

Aleșd
Nucet
Săcueni
Ștei
Valea lui Mihai
Vașcău

Communes

Abram
Aștileu
Aușeu
Avram Iancu
Balc
Batăr
Biharia
Boianu Mare
Borod
Borș
Bratca
Brusturi
Budureasa
Buduslău
Bulz
Buntești
Căbești
Câmpani
Căpâlna
Cărpinet
Cefa
Ceica
Cetariu
Cherechiu
Chișlaz
Ciumeghiu
Cociuba Mare
Copăcel
Criștioru de Jos
Curățele
Curtuișeni
Derna
Diosig
Dobrești
Drăgănești
Drăgești
Finiș
Gepiu
Girișu de Criș
Hidișelu de Sus
Holod
Husasău de Tinca
Ineu
Lăzăreni
Lazuri de Beiuș
Lugașu de Jos
Lunca
Mădăras
Măgești
Nojorid
Olcea
Oșorhei
Paleu
Petreu
Pietroasa
Pocola
Pomezeu
Popești
Răbăgani
Remetea
Rieni
Roșia
Roșiori
Sâmbăta
Sâniob
Sânnicolau Român
Sânmartin
Sântandrei
Sârbi
Săcădat
Sălacea
Sălard
Spinuș
Suplacu de Barcău
Șimian
Șinteu
Șoimi
Șuncuiuș
Tămășeu
Tărcaia
Tarcea
Tăuteu
Tileagd
Tinca
Toboliu
Tulca
Țețchea
Uileacu de Beiuș
Vadu Crișului
Vârciorog
Viișoara

Bistrița-Năsăud County
1 municipality, 3 towns and 58 communes
Municipalities
Bistrița - capital
Towns

Beclean
Năsăud
Sângeorz-Băi

Communes

Bistrița Bârgăului
Braniștea
Budacu de Jos
Budești
Căianu Mic
Cetate
Chiochiș
Chiuza
Ciceu-Giurgești
Ciceu-Mihăiești
Coșbuc
Dumitra
Dumitrița
Feldru
Galații Bistriței
Ilva Mare
Ilva Mică
Josenii Bârgăului
Leșu
Lechința
Livezile
Lunca Ilvei
Maieru
Matei
Măgura Ilvei
Mărișelu
Miceștii de Câmpie
Milaș
Monor
Negrilești
Nimigea
Nușeni
Parva
Petru Rareș
Poiana Ilvei
Prundu Bârgăului
Rebra
Rebrișoara
Rodna
Romuli
Runcu Salvei
Salva
Sânmihaiu de Câmpie
Șieu
Șieu-Odorhei
Șieu-Măgheruș
Șieuț
Șintereag
Silivașu de Câmpie
Spermezeu
Șanț
Târlișua
Teaca
Telciu
Tiha Bârgăului
Uriu
Urmeniș
Zagra

Cluj County
5 municipalities, 1 town and 75 communes
Municipalities

Câmpia Turzii
Cluj-Napoca - capital
Dej
Gherla
Turda

Towns
Huedin
Communes

Aghireșu
Aiton
Aluniș
Apahida
Așchileu
Baciu
Băișoara
Beliș
Bobâlna
Bonțida
Borșa
Buza
Căianu
Călărași
Călățele
Cămărașu
Căpușu Mare
Cășeiu
Cătina
Câțcău
Ceanu Mare
Chinteni
Chiuiești
Ciucea
Ciurila
Cojocna
Cornești
Cuzdrioara
Dăbâca
Feleacu
Fizeșu Gherlii
Florești
Frata
Gârbău
Geaca
Gilău
Iara
Iclod
Izvoru Crișului
Jichișu de Jos
Jucu
Luna
Măguri-Răcătău
Mănăstireni
Mărgău
Mărișel
Mica
Mihai Viteazu
Mintiu Gherlii
Mociu
Moldovenești
Negreni
Pălatca
Panticeu
Petreștii de Jos
Ploscoș
Poieni
Râșca
Recea-Cristur
Săcuieu
Săndulești
Săvădisla
Sâncraiu
Sânmartin
Sânpaul
Sic
Suatu
Tritenii de Jos
Tureni
Țaga
Unguraș
Vad
Valea Ierii
Viișoara
Vultureni

Maramureș County
2 municipalities, 11 towns and 63 communes
Municipalities

Baia Mare - capital
Sighetu Marmației

Towns

Baia Sprie
Borșa
Cavnic
Dragomirești
Săliștea de Sus
Seini
Șomcuta Mare
Târgu Lăpuș
Tăuții-Măgherăuș
Ulmeni
Vișeu de Sus

Communes

Ardusat
Ariniș
Asuaju de Sus
Băița de sub Codru
Băiuț
Bârsana
Băsești
Bicaz
Bistra
Bocicoiu Mare
Bogdan Vodă
Boiu Mare
Botiza
Budești
Călinești
Câmpulung la Tisa
Cernești
Cicârlău
Coaș
Coltău
Copalnic-Mănăștur
Coroieni
Cupșeni
Desești
Dumbrăvița
Fărcașa
Gârdani
Giulești
Groși
Groșii Țibleșului
Ieud
Lăpuș
Leordina
Mireșu Mare
Moisei
Oarța de Jos
Ocna Șugatag
Oncești
Petrova
Poienile de sub Munte
Poienile Izei
Recea
Remetea Chioarului
Remeți
Repedea
Rona de Jos
Rona de Sus
Rozavlea
Ruscova
Săcălășeni
Săcel
Sălsig
Săpânța
Sarasău
Satulung
Șieu
Șișești
Strâmtura
Suciu de Sus
Vadu Izei
Valea Chioarului
Vima Mică
Vișeu de Jos

Satu Mare County
2 municipalities, 4 towns and 59 communes
Municipalities

Satu Mare - capital
Carei

Towns

Ardud
Livada
Negrești-Oaș
Tășnad

Communes

Acâș
Agriș
Andrid
Apa
Bătarci
Beltiug
Berveni
Bixad
Bârsău
Bogdand
Botiz
Călinești-Oaș
Cămărzana
Cămin
Căpleni
Căuaș
Cehal
Certeze
Ciumești
Craidorolț
Crucișor
Culciu
Doba
Dorolț
Foieni
Gherța Mică
Halmeu
Hodod
Homoroade
Lazuri
Medieșu Aurit
Micula
Moftin
Odoreu
Orașu Nou
Păulești
Petrești
Pir
Pișcolt
Pomi
Porumbești
Racșa
Sanislău
Santău
Săcășeni
Săuca
Socond
Supur
Tarna Mare
Terebești
Tiream
Târșolț
Turț
Turulung
Urziceni
Valea Vinului
Vetiș
Viile Satu Mare
Vama

Sălaj County
1 municipality, 3 towns and 58 communes; subdivided into 281 villages
Municipalities
Zalău - capital
Towns

Cehu Silvaniei
Jibou
Șimleu Silvaniei

Communes

Agrij
Almașu
Băbeni
Bălan
Bănișor
Benesat
Bobota
Bocșa
Boghiș
Buciumi
Camăr
Carastelec
Chieșd
Cizer
Coșeiu
Crasna
Creaca
Crișeni
Cristolț
Cuzăplac
Dobrin
Dragu
Fildu de Jos
Gâlgău
Gârbou
Halmășd
Hereclean
Hida
Horoatu Crasnei
Ileanda
Ip
Letca
Lozna
Măeriște
Marca
Meseșenii de Jos
Mirșid
Năpradea
Nușfalău
Pericei
Plopiș
Poiana Blenchii
Românași
Rus
Sălățig
Sâg
Sânmihaiu Almașului
Someș-Odorhei
Surduc
Șamșud
Sărmășag
Șimișna
Treznea
Valcău de Jos
Vârșolț
Zalha
Zimbor

Central Romania

Alba County
4 municipalities, 7 towns and 68 communes
Municipalities

Aiud
Alba Iulia - capital
Blaj
Sebeș

Towns

Abrud
Baia de Arieș
Câmpeni
Cugir
Ocna Mureș
Teiuș
Zlatna

Communes

Albac
Almașu Mare
Arieșeni
Avram Iancu
Berghin
Bistra
Blandiana
Bucerdea Grânoasă
Bucium
Câlnic
Cenade
Cergău
Ceru-Băcăinți
Cetatea de Baltă
Ciugud
Ciuruleasa
Crăciunelu de Jos
Cricău
Cut
Daia Română
Doștat
Fărău
Galda de Jos
Gârbova
Gârda de Sus
Hopârta
Horea
Ighiu
Întregalde
Jidvei
Livezile
Lopadea Nouă
Lunca Mureșului
Lupșa
Meteș
Mihalț
Mirăslău
Mogoș
Noșlac
Ocoliș
Ohaba
Pianu
Poiana Vadului
Ponor
Poșaga
Rădești
Râmeț
Rimetea
Roșia de Secaș
Roșia Montană
Sălciua
Săliștea
Sâncel
Sântimbru
Săsciori
Scărișoara
Șibot
Sohodol
Șona
Șpring
Stremț
Șugag
Unirea
Vadu Moților
Valea Lungă
Vidra
Vințu de Jos

Brașov County
4 municipalities, 6 towns and 48 communes
Municipalities

Brașov - capital
Codlea
Făgăraș
Săcele

Towns

Ghimbav
Predeal
Râșnov
Rupea
Victoria
Zărnești

Communes

Apața
Augustin
Beclean
Bod
Bran
Budila
Bunești
Cața
Cincu
Comăna
Cristian
Crizbav
Drăguș
Dumbrăvița
Feldioara
Fundata
Hălchiu
Hărman
Hârseni
Hoghiz
Holbav
Homorod
Jibert
Lisa
Mândra
Măieruș
Moieciu
Ormeniș
Părău
Poiana Mărului
Prejmer
Racoș
Recea
Șercaia
Șinca
Șinca Nouă
Sâmbăta de Sus
Sânpetru
Șoarș
Tărlungeni
Teliu
Ticușu
Ucea
Ungra
Vama Buzăului
Viștea
Voila
Vulcan

Covasna County
2 municipalities, 3 towns and 40 communes
Municipalities

Sfântu Gheorghe (Sepsiszentgyörgy) - capital
Târgu Secuiesc (Kézdivásárhely)

Towns

Baraolt (Barót)
Covasna (Kovászna)
Întorsura Buzăului (Bodzaforduló)

Communes

Aita Mare (Nagyajta)
Arcuș (Árkos)
Barcani (Zágonbárkány)
Bățani (Nagybacon)
Belin (Bölön)
Bixad (Sepsibükszád)
Bodoc (Sepsibodok)
Boroșneu Mare (Nagyborosnyó)
Brăduț (Bardoc)
Brateș (Barátos)
Brețcu (Bereck)
Catalina (Szentkatolna)
Cernat (Csernáton)
Chichiș (Kökös)
Comandău (Kommandó)
Dalnic (Dálnok)
Dobârlău (Dobolló)
Estelnic (Esztelnek)
Ghelința (Gelence)
Ghidfalău (Gidófalva)
Hăghig (Hídvég)
Ilieni (Illyefalva)
Lemnia (Lemhény)
Malnaș (Málnás)
Mereni (Kézdialmás)
Micfalău (Mikóújfalu)
Moacșa (Maksa)
Ojdula (Ozsdola)
Ozun (Uzon)
Poian (Kézdiszentkereszt)
Reci (Réty)
Sânzieni (Kézdiszentlélek)
Sita Buzăului (Szitabodza)
Turia (Torja)
Vâlcele (Előpatak)
Valea Crișului (Sepsikőröspatak)
Valea Mare (Nagypatak)
Vârghiș (Vargyas)
Zăbala (Zabola)
Zagon (Zágon)

Harghita County
4 municipalities, 5 towns and 58 communes
Municipalities

Gheorgheni (Gyergyószentmiklós)
Miercurea Ciuc (Csíkszereda) - capital
Odorheiu Secuiesc (Székelyudvarhely)
Toplița (Maroshévíz)

Towns

Băile Tușnad (Tusnádfürdő)
Bălan (Balánbánya)
Borsec (Borszék)
Cristuru Secuiesc (Székelykeresztúr)
Vlăhița (Szentegyháza)

Communes

Atid (Etéd)
Avrămești (Szentábrahám)
Bilbor (Bélbor)
Brădești (Fenyéd)
Căpâlnița (Kápolnásfalu)
Cârța (Csíkkarcfalva)
Ciceu (Csíkcsicsó)
Ciucsângeorgiu (Csíkszentgyörgy)
Ciumani (Gyergyócsomafalva)
Corbu (Gyergyóholló)
Corund (Korond)
Cozmeni (Csíkkozmás)
Dănești (Csíkdánfalva)
Dârjiu (Székelyderzs)
Dealu (Oroszhegy)
Ditrău (Ditró)
Feliceni (Felsőboldogfalva)
Frumoasa (Szépvíz)
Gălăuțaș (Galócás)
Joseni (Gyergyóalfalu)
Lăzarea (Gyergyószárhegy)
Leliceni (Csíkszentlélek)
Lueta (Lövéte)
Lunca de Jos (Gyimesközéplok)
Lunca de Sus (Gyimesfelsőlok)
Lupeni (Farkaslaka)
Mădăraș (Csíkmadaras)
Mărtiniș (Homoródszentmárton)
Merești (Homoródalmás)
Mihăileni (Csíkszentmihály)
Mugeni (Bögöz)
Ocland (Oklánd)
Păuleni-Ciuc (Csíkpálfalva)
Plăieșii de Jos (Kászonaltíz)
Porumbeni (Galambfalva)
Praid (Parajd)
Racu (Csíkrákos)
Remetea (Gyergyóremete)
Săcel (Székelyandrásfalva)
Sâncrăieni (Csíkszentkirály)
Sândominic (Csíkszentdomokos)
Sânmartin (Csíkszentmárton)
Sânsimion (Csíkszentsimon)
Sântimbru (Csíkszentimre)
Sărmaș (Salamás)
Satu Mare (Máréfalva)
Secuieni (Újszékely)
Siculeni (Madéfalva)
Șimonești (Siménfalva)
Subcetate (Gyergyóvárhegy)
Suseni (Gyergyóújfalu)
Tomești (Csíkszenttamás)
Tulgheș (Gyergyótölgyes)
Tușnad (Tusnád)
Ulieș (Kányád)
Vărșag (Székelyvarság)
Voșlăbeni (Vasláb)
Zetea (Zetelaka)

Mureș County
4 municipalities, 7 towns and 91 communes
Municipalities

Reghin
Sighișoara
Târgu Mureș - capital
Târnăveni

Towns

Iernut
Luduș
Miercurea Nirajului
Sângeorgiu de Pădure
Sărmașu
Sovata
Ungheni

Communes

Acățari
Adămuș
Albești
Aluniș
Apold
Ațintiș
Bahnea
Band
Batoș
Băgaciu
Băla
Bălăușeri
Beica de Jos
Bereni
Bichiș
Bogata
Brâncovenești
Breaza
Ceuașu de Câmpie
Chețani
Chibed
Chiheru de Jos
Coroisânmărtin
Corunca
Cozma
Crăciunești
Cucerdea
Crăiești
Cristești
Cuci
Daneș
Deda
Eremitu
Ernei
Fântânele
Fărăgău
Gălești
Gănești
Gheorghe Doja
Ghindari
Glodeni
Gornești
Grebenișu de Câmpie
Gurghiu
Hodac
Hodoșa
Ibănești
Iclănzel
Ideciu de Jos
Livezeni
Lunca
Lunca Bradului
Mădăraș
Măgherani
Mica
Miheșu de Câmpie
Nadeș
Neaua
Ogra
Papiu Ilarian
Pănet
Păsăreni
Petelea
Pogăceaua
Râciu
Răstolița
Rușii-Munți
Sâncraiu de Mureș
Sângeorgiu de Mureș
Sânger
Sânpaul
Sânpetru de Câmpie
Sântana de Mureș
Sărățeni
Saschiz
Solovăstru
Stânceni
Suplac
Suseni
Șăulia
Șincai
Tăureni
Valea Largă
Vânători
Vărgata
Vătava
Vețca
Viișoara
Voivodeni
Zagăr
Zau de Câmpie

Sibiu County
2 municipalities, 9 towns and 53 communes
Municipalities

Mediaș
Sibiu - capital

Towns

Agnita
Avrig
Cisnădie
Copșa Mică
Dumbrăveni
Miercurea Sibiului
Ocna Sibiului
Săliște
Tălmaciu

Communes

Alma
Alțâna
Apoldu de Jos
Arpașu de Jos
Ațel
Axente Sever
Bazna
Bârghiș
Biertan
Blăjel
Boița
Brateiu
Brădeni
Bruiu
Chirpăr
Cârța
Cârțișoara
Cristian
Dârlos
Gura Râului
Hoghilag
Iacobeni
Jina
Laslea
Loamneș
Ludoș
Marpod
Merghindeal
Micăsasa
Mihăileni
Moșna
Nocrich
Orlat
Păuca
Poiana Sibiului
Poplaca
Porumbacu de Jos
Racovița
Rășinari
Râu Sadului
Roșia
Sadu
Slimnic
Șeica Mare
Șeica Mică
Șelimbăr
Șura Mare
Șura Mică
Tilișca
Târnava
Turnu Roșu
Valea Viilor
Vurpăr

Macroregiunea 2

North-East Romania

Bacău County
3 municipalities, 5 towns and 85 communes
Municipalities

Bacău - capital
Moinești
Onești

Towns

Buhuși
Comănești
Dărmănești
Slănic-Moldova
Târgu Ocna

Communes

Agăș
Ardeoani
Asău
Balcani
Berești-Bistrița
Berești-Tazlău
Berzunți
Bârsănești
Blăgești
Bogdănești
Brusturoasa
Buciumi
Buhoci
Cașin
Căiuți
Cleja
Colonești
Corbasca
Coțofănești
Dămienești
Dealu Morii
Dofteana
Faraoani
Filipeni
Filipești
Găiceana
Ghimeș-Făget
Gârleni
Glăvănești
Gioseni
Gura Văii
Helegiu
Hemeiuș
Huruiești
Horgești
Izvoru Berheciului
Itești
Letea Veche
Lipova
Livezi
Luizi-Călugăra
Măgirești
Măgura
Mănăstirea Cașin
Mărgineni
Motoșeni
Negri
Nicolae Bălcescu
Odobești
Oituz
Oncești
Orbeni
Palanca
Parava
Pâncești
Parincea
Pârgărești
Pârjol
Plopana
Podu Turcului
Poduri
Prăjești
Racova
Răcăciuni
Răchitoasa
Roșiori
Sascut
Sănduleni
Sărata
Săucești
Scorțeni
Secuieni
Solonț
Stănișești
Strugari
Ștefan cel Mare
Tamași
Tătărăști
Târgu Trotuș
Traian
Ungureni
Urechești
Valea Seacă
Vultureni
Zemeș

Botoșani County
2 municipalities, 5 towns and 71 communes
Municipalities

Botoșani - capital
Dorohoi

Towns

Bucecea
Darabani
Flămânzi
Săveni
Ștefănești

Communes

Adășeni
Albești
Avrămeni
Bălușeni
Blândești
Brăești
Broscăuți
Călărași
Cândești
Concești
Copălău
Cordăreni
Corlăteni
Corni
Coșula
Coțușca
Cristești
Cristinești
Curtești
Dersca
Dângeni
Dimăcheni
Dobârceni
Drăgușeni
Durnești
Frumușica
George Enescu
Gorbănești
Havârna
Hănești
Hilișeu-Horia
Hlipiceni
Hudești
Ibănești
Leorda
Lozna
Lunca
Manoleasa
Mihai Eminescu
Mihăileni
Mihălășeni
Mileanca
Mitoc
Nicșeni
Păltiniș
Pomârla
Prăjeni
Rădăuți-Prut
Răchiți
Răuseni
Ripiceni
Roma
Românești
Santa Mare
Stăuceni
Suharău
Sulița
Șendriceni
Știubieni
Todireni
Trușești
Tudora
Ungureni
Unțeni
Văculești
Viișoara
Vârfu Câmpului
Vlădeni
Vlăsinești
Vorniceni
Vorona

Iași County
2 municipalities, 3 towns and 93 communes
Municipalities

Iași - capital
Pașcani

Towns

Hârlău
Podu Iloaiei
Târgu Frumos

Communes

Alexandru Ioan Cuza
Andrieșeni
Aroneanu
Balș
Bălțați
Bârnova
Belcești
Bivolari
Brăești
Butea
Ceplenița
Ciohorăni
Ciortești
Ciurea
Coarnele Caprei
Comarna
Costești
Costuleni
Cotnari
Cozmești
Cristești
Cucuteni
Dagâța
Deleni
Dobrovăț
Dolhești
Drăgușeni
Dumești
Erbiceni
Fântânele
Focuri
Golăiești
Gorban
Grajduri
Gropnița
Grozești
Hălăucești
Hărmănești
Heleșteni
Holboca
Horlești
Ion Neculce
Ipatele
Lespezi
Lețcani
Lungani
Mădârjac
Mircești
Mironeasa
Miroslava
Miroslovești
Mogoșești
Mogoșești-Siret
Moșna
Moțca
Movileni
Oțeleni
Plugari
Popești
Popricani
Prisăcani
Probota
Răchiteni
Răducăneni
Rediu
Românești
Roșcani
Ruginoasa
Scânteia
Schitu Duca
Scobinți
Sinești
Sirețel
Stolniceni-Prăjescu
Strunga
Șcheia
Șipote
Tansa
Tătăruși
Țibana
Țibănești
Țigănași
Todirești
Tomești
Trifești
Țuțora
Ungheni
Valea Lupului
Valea Seacă
Vânători
Victoria
Vlădeni
Voinești

Neamț County
2 municipalities, 3 towns and 78 communes
Municipalities

Piatra Neamț - capital
Roman

Towns

Bicaz
Roznov
Târgu Neamț

Communes

Agapia
Alexandru cel Bun
Bahna
Bălțătești
Bârgăuani
Bicaz-Chei
Bicazu Ardelean
Bâra
Bodești
Boghicea
Borca
Borlești
Botești
Bozieni
Brusturi
Cândești
Ceahlău
Cordun
Costișa
Crăcăoani
Dămuc
Dobreni
Dochia
Doljești
Dragomirești
Drăgănești
Dulcești
Dumbrava Roșie
Farcașa
Făurei
Gâdinți
Gârcina
Gherăești
Ghindăoani
Girov
Grințieș
Grumăzești
Hangu
Horia
Icușești
Ion Creangă
Mărgineni
Moldoveni
Negrești
Oniceni
Păstrăveni
Pâncești
Pângărați
Petricani
Piatra Șoimului
Pipirig
Podoleni
Poiana Teiului
Poienari
Răucești
Războieni
Rediu
Români
Ruginoasa
Sagna
Săbăoani
Săvinești
Secuieni
Stănița
Ștefan cel Mare
Tarcău
Tașca
Tazlău
Tămășeni
Timișești
Trifești
Tupilați
Țibucani
Urecheni
Valea Ursului
Văleni
Vânători-Neamț
Zănești

Suceava County
5 municipalities, 11 towns and 98 communes
Municipalities

Câmpulung Moldovenesc
Fălticeni
Rădăuți
Suceava - capital
Vatra Dornei

Towns

Broșteni
Cajvana
Dolhasca
Frasin
Gura Humorului
Liteni
Milișăuți
Salcea
Siret
Solca
Vicovu de Sus

Communes

Adâncata
Arbore
Baia
Bălăceana
Bălcăuți
Berchișești
Bilca
Bogdănești
Boroaia
Bosanci
Botoșana
Breaza
Brodina
Bunești
Burla
Cacica
Calafindești
Capu Câmpului
Cârlibaba
Ciocănești
Ciprian Porumbescu
Comănești
Cornu Luncii
Coșna
Crucea
Dărmănești
Dolhești
Dorna-Arini
Dorna Candrenilor
Dornești
Drăgoiești
Drăgușeni
Dumbrăveni
Fântâna Mare
Fântânele
Forăști
Frătăuții Noi
Frătăuții Vechi
Frumosu
Fundu Moldovei
Gălănești
Grămești
Grănicești
Hănțești
Hârtop
Horodnic de Jos
Horodnic de Sus
Horodniceni
Iacobeni
Iaslovăț
Ilișești
Ipotești
Izvoarele Sucevei
Mălini
Mănăstirea Humorului
Marginea
Mitocu Dragomirnei
Moara
Moldova-Sulița
Moldovița
Mușenița
Ostra
Păltinoasa
Panaci
Pârteștii de Jos
Pătrăuți
Poiana Stampei
Poieni-Solca
Pojorâta
Preutești
Putna
Rădășeni
Râșca
Sadova
Șaru Dornei
Satu Mare
Șcheia
Șerbăuți
Siminicea
Slatina
Straja
Stroiești
Stulpicani
Sucevița
Todirești
Udești
Ulma
Vadu Moldovei
Valea Moldovei
Vama
Vatra Moldoviței
Verești
Vicovu de Jos
Voitinel
Volovăț
Vulturești
Zamostea
Zvoriștea

Vaslui County
3 municipalities, 2 towns and 81 communes
Municipalities

Bârlad
Huși
Vaslui - capital

Towns

Murgeni
Negrești

Communes

Albești
Alexandru Vlahuță
Arsura
Băcani
Băcești
Bălteni
Banca
Berezeni
Blăgești
Bogdana
Bogdănești
Bogdănița
Boțești
Bunești-Averești
Ciocani
Codăești
Coroiești
Costești
Cozmești
Crețești
Dănești
Deleni
Delești
Dimitrie Cantemir
Dodești
Dragomirești
Drânceni
Duda-Epureni
Dumești
Epureni
Fălciu
Ferești
Fruntișeni
Găgești
Gârceni
Gherghești
Grivița
Hoceni
Iana
Ibănești
Ivănești
Ivești
Laza
Lipovăț
Lunca Banului
Mălușteni
Miclești
Muntenii de Jos
Muntenii de Sus
Oltenești
Oșești
Pădureni
Perieni
Pochidia
Pogana
Pogonești
Poienești
Puiești
Pungești
Pușcași
Rafaila
Rebricea
Roșiești
Solești
Stănilești
Ștefan cel Mare
Șuletea
Tăcuta
Tanacu
Tătărăni
Todirești
Tutova
Văleni
Vetrișoaia
Viișoara
Vinderei
Voinești
Vulturești
Vutcani
Zăpodeni
Zorleni

South-East Romania

Brăila County
1 municipality, 3 towns and 40 communes
Municipalities
Brăila - capital
Towns

Făurei
Ianca
Însurăței

Communes

Bărăganul
Berteștii de Jos
Bordei Verde
Cazasu
Chiscani
Ciocile
Cireșu
Dudești
Frecăței
Galbenu
Gemenele
Grădiștea
Gropeni
Jirlău
Mărașu
Măxineni
Mircea Vodă
Movila Miresii
Racovița
Râmnicelu
Romanu
Roșiori
Salcia Tudor
Scorțaru Nou
Siliștea
Stăncuța
Surdila-Găiseanca
Surdila-Greci
Șuțești
Tichilești
Traian
Tudor Vladimirescu
Tufești
Ulmu
Unirea
Vădeni
Victoria
Vișani
Viziru
Zăvoaia

Buzău County
2 municipalities, 3 towns and 82 communes
Municipalities

Buzău - capital
Râmnicu Sărat

Towns

Nehoiu
Pătârlagele
Pogoanele

Communes

Amaru
Bălăceanu
Balta Albă
Beceni
Berca
Bisoca
Blăjani
Boldu
Bozioru
Brădeanu
Brăești
Breaza
Buda
C.A. Rosetti
Calvini
Cănești
Cătina
Cernătești
Chiliile
Chiojdu
Cilibia
Cislău
Cochirleanca
Colți
Costești
Cozieni
Florica
Gălbinași
Gherăseni
Ghergheasa
Glodeanu Sărat
Glodeanu-Siliștea
Grebănu
Gura Teghii
Largu
Lopătari
Luciu
Măgura
Mărăcineni
Mărgăritești
Mânzălești
Merei
Mihăilești
Movila Banului
Murgești
Năeni
Odăile
Padina
Pardoși
Pănătău
Pârscov
Pietroasele
Podgoria
Poșta Câlnău
Puiești
Racovițeni
Râmnicelu
Robeasca
Rușețu
Săgeata
Săhăteni
Săpoca
Sărulești
Scorțoasa
Scutelnici
Siriu
Smeeni
Stâlpu
Tisău
Topliceni
Țintești
Ulmeni
Unguriu
Vadu Pașii
Valea Râmnicului
Valea Salciei
Vâlcelele
Vernești
Vintilă Vodă
Viperești
Zărnești
Ziduri

Constanța County
3 municipalities, 9 towns and 58 communes
Municipalities

Constanța - capital
Mangalia
Medgidia

Towns

Băneasa
Cernavodă
Eforie
Hârșova
Murfatlar
Năvodari
Negru Vodă
Ovidiu
Techirghiol

Communes

23 August
Adamclisi
Agigea
Albești
Aliman
Amzacea
Bărăganu
Castelu
Cerchezu
Chirnogeni
Ciobanu
Ciocârlia
Cobadin
Cogealac
Comana
Corbu
Costinești
Crucea
Cumpăna
Cuza Vodă
Deleni
Dobromir
Dumbrăveni
Fântânele
Gârliciu
Ghindărești
Grădina
Horia
Independența
Ion Corvin
Istria
Limanu
Lipnița
Lumina
Mereni
Mihai Viteazu
Mihail Kogălniceanu
Mircea Vodă
Nicolae Bălcescu
Oltina
Ostrov
Pantelimon
Pecineaga
Peștera
Poarta Albă
Rasova
Saligny
Saraiu
Săcele
Seimeni
Siliștea
Târgușor
Topalu
Topraisar
Tortoman
Tuzla
Valu lui Traian
Vulturu

Galați County
2 municipalities, 2 towns and 61 communes
Municipalities

Galați - capital
Tecuci

Towns

Berești
Târgu Bujor

Communes

Bălăbănești
Bălășești
Băleni
Băneasa
Barcea
Berești-Meria
Brăhășești
Braniștea
Buciumeni
Cavadinești
Cerțești
Corni
Corod
Cosmești
Costache Negri
Cuca
Cudalbi
Cuza Vodă
Drăgănești
Drăgușeni
Fârțănești
Foltești
Frumușița
Fundeni
Ghidigeni
Gohor
Grivița
Independența
Ivești
Jorăști
Liești
Măstăcani
Matca
Movileni
Munteni
Nămoloasa
Negrilești
Nicorești
Oancea
Pechea
Piscu
Poiana
Priponești
Rădești
Rediu
Scânteiești
Schela
Șendreni
Slobozia Conachi
Smârdan
Smulți
Suceveni
Suhurlui
Țepu
Tudor Vladimirescu
Tulucești
Umbrărești
Valea Mărului
Vânători
Vârlezi
Vlădești

Tulcea County
1 municipality, 4 towns and 46 communes
Municipalities
Tulcea - capital
Towns

Babadag
Isaccea
Măcin
Sulina

Communes

Baia
Beidaud
Beștepe
C. A. Rosetti
Carcaliu
Casimcea
Ceamurlia de Jos
Ceatalchioi
Cerna
Chilia Veche
Ciucurova
Crișan
Dăeni
Dorobanțu
Frecăței
Greci
Grindu
Hamcearca
Horia
I. C. Brătianu (Zaclău, 23 August)
Izvoarele
Jijila
Jurilovca (Unirea)
Luncavița
Mahmudia
Maliuc
Mihai Bravu
Mihai Kogălniceanu
Murighiol (Independența)
Nalbant
Niculițel
Nufăru
Ostrov
Pardina (1 Mai)
Peceneaga
Sarichioi
Sfântu Gheorghe
Slava Cercheză
Smârdan
Somova
Stejaru
Topolog
Turcoaia
Valea Nucarilor
Valea Teilor
Văcăreni

Vrancea County
2 municipalities, 3 towns and 68 communes
Municipalities

Adjud
Focșani - capital

Towns

Mărășești
Odobești
Panciu

Communes

Andreiașu de Jos
Bălești
Bârsești
Biliești
Boghești
Bolotești
Bordești
Broșteni
Câmpineanca
Câmpuri
Cârligele
Chiojdeni
Ciorăști
Corbița
Cotești
Dumbrăveni
Dumitrești
Fitionești
Garoafa
Golești
Gologanu
Gugești
Gura Caliței
Homocea
Jariștea
Jitia
Măicănești
Mera
Milcovul
Movilița
Nănești
Năruja
Negrilești
Nereju
Nistorești
Obrejița
Paltin
Păulești
Păunești
Ploscuțeni
Poiana Cristei
Popești
Pufești
Răcoasa
Răstoaca
Reghiu
Ruginești
Sihlea
Slobozia Bradului
Slobozia Ciorăști
Soveja
Spulber
Străoane
Suraia
Tâmboești
Tănăsoaia
Tătăranu
Tulnici
Țifești
Urechești
Valea Sării
Vânători
Vârteșcoiu
Vidra
Vintileasca
Vizantea-Livezi
Vrâncioaia
Vulturu

Macroregiunea 3

South Romania-Muntenia

Argeș County
3 municipalities, 4 towns and 95 communes
Municipalities

Câmpulung
Curtea de Argeș
Pitești - capital

Towns

Costești
Mioveni
Ștefănești
Topoloveni

Communes

Albeștii de Argeș
Albeștii de Muscel
Albota
Aninoasa
Arefu
Băbana
Băiculești
Bălilești
Bârla
Bascov
Beleți-Negrești
Berevoești
Bogați
Boteni
Boțești
Bradu
Brăduleț
Budeasa
Bughea de Jos
Bughea de Sus
Buzoești
Căldăraru
Călinești
Căteasca
Cepari
Cetățeni
Cicănești
Ciofrângeni
Ciomăgești
Cocu
Corbeni
Corbi
Coșești
Cotmeana
Cuca
Dâmbovicioara
Dârmănești
Davidești
Dobrești
Domnești
Drăganu
Dragoslavele
Godeni
Hârsești
Hârtiești
Izvoru
Leordeni
Lerești
Lunca Corbului
Mălureni
Mărăcineni
Merișani
Micești
Mihăești
Mioarele
Miroși
Morărești
Moșoaia
Mozăceni
Mușătești
Negrași
Nucșoara
Oarja
Pietroșani
Poiana Lacului
Poienarii de Argeș
Poienarii de Muscel
Popești
Priboieni
Râca
Rătești
Recea
Rociu
Rucăr
Sălătrucu
Săpata
Schitu Golești
Slobozia
Stâlpeni
Ștefan cel Mare
Stoenești
Stolnici
Șuici
Suseni
Teiu
Tigveni
Țițești
Uda
Ungheni
Valea Danului
Valea Iașului
Valea Mare-Pravăț
Vedea
Vlădești
Vulturești

Călărași County
2 municipalities, 3 towns and 50 communes
Municipalities

Călărași - capital
Oltenița

Towns

Budești
Fundulea
Lehliu Gară

Communes

Alexandru Odobescu
Belciugatele
Borcea
Căscioarele
Chirnogi
Chiselet
Crivăț
Ciocănești
Curcani
Cuza Vodă
Dichiseni
Dor Mărunt
Dorobanțu
Dragalina
Dragoș Vodă
Frăsinet
Frumușani
Fundeni
Gălbinași
Grădiștea
Gurbănești
Ileana
Independența
Jegălia
Lehliu
Luica
Lupșanu
Mânăstirea
Mitreni
Modelu
Nana
Nicolae Bălcescu
Perișoru
Plătărești
Radovanu
Roseți
Sărulești
Sohatu
Spanțov
Șoldanu
Ștefan cel Mare
Ștefan Vodă
Tămădău Mare
Ulmeni
Ulmu
Unirea
Valea Argovei
Vasilați
Vâlcelele
Vlad Țepeș

Dâmbovița County
2 municipalities, 5 towns and 82 communes
Municipalities

Moreni
Târgoviște - capital

Towns

Fieni
Găești
Pucioasa
Răcari
Titu

Communes

Aninoasa
Băleni
Bărbulețu
Bezdead
Bilciurești
Braniștea
Brănești
Brezoaele
Buciumeni
Bucșani
Butimanu
Cândești
Ciocănești
Cobia
Cojasca
Comișani
Conțești
Corbii Mari
Cornățelu
Cornești
Costeștii din Vale
Crângurile
Crevedia
Dărmănești
Dobra
Doicești
Dragodana
Dragomirești
Finta
Glodeni
Gura Foii
Gura Ocniței
Gura Șuții
Hulubești
I. L. Caragiale
Iedera
Lucieni
Ludești
Lungulețu
Malu cu Flori
Mănești
Mătăsaru
Mogoșani
Moroeni
Morteni
Moțăieni
Niculești
Nucet
Ocnița
Odobești
Perșinari
Pietrari
Petrești
Pietroșița
Poiana
Potlogi
Produlești
Pucheni
Raciu
Răscăeți
Răzvad
Râu Alb
Runcu
Sălcioara
Slobozia Moară
Șelaru, Dâmbovița
Șotânga
Tărtășești
Tătărani
Uliești
Ulmi
Văcărești
Valea Lungă
Valea Mare
Văleni-Dâmbovița
Vârfuri
Vișina
Vișinești
Vlădeni
Voinești
Vulcana-Băi
Vulcana-Pandele

Giurgiu County
1 municipality, 2 towns and 51 communes
Municipalities
Giurgiu - capital
Towns

Bolintin-Vale
Mihăilești

Communes

Adunații-Copăceni
Băneasa
Bolintin-Deal
Bucșani
Bulbucata
Buturugeni
Călugăreni
Clejani
Colibași
Comana
Cosoba
Crevedia Mare
Daia
Florești-Stoenești
Frătești
Găiseni
Găujani
Ghimpați
Gogoșari
Gostinari
Gostinu
Grădinari
Greaca
Herăști
Hotarele
Iepurești
Isvoarele
Izvoarele
Joița
Letca Nouă
Malu
Mârșa
Mihai Bravu
Ogrezeni
Oinacu
Prundu
Putineiu
Răsuceni
Roata de Jos
Săbăreni
Schitu
Singureni
Slobozia
Stănești
Stoenești
Toporu
Ulmi
Valea Dragului
Vânătorii Mici
Vărăști
Vedea

Ialomița County
3 municipalities, 4 towns and 59 communes
Municipalities

Fetești
Slobozia - capital
Urziceni

Towns

Amara
Căzănești
Fierbinți-Târg
Țăndărei

Communes

Adâncata
Albești
Alexeni
Andrășești
Armășești
Axintele
Balaciu
Bărbulești
Bărcănești
Borănești
Bordușani
Bucu
Buești
Ciocârlia
Ciochina
Ciulnița
Cocora
Colelia
Cosâmbești
Coșereni
Drăgoești
Dridu
Făcăeni
Gârbovi
Gheorghe Doja
Gheorghe Lazăr
Giurgeni
Grindu
Grivița
Gura Ialomiței
Ion Roată
Jilavele
Maia
Manasia
Mărculești
Mihail Kogălniceanu
Miloșești
Moldoveni
Movila
Movilița
Munteni-Buzău 
Ograda
Perieți
Platonești
Rădulești
Reviga
Roșiori
Sălcioara
Sărățeni
Săveni
Scânteia
Sfântu Gheorghe
Sinești
Stelnica
Sudiți
Traian
Valea Ciorii
Valea Măcrișului
Vlădeni

Prahova County
2 municipalities, 12 towns and 90 communes
Municipalities

Câmpina
Ploiești - capital

Towns

Azuga
Băicoi
Boldești-Scăeni
Breaza
Bușteni
Comarnic
Mizil
Plopeni
Sinaia
Slănic
Urlați
Vălenii de Munte

Communes

Adunați
Albești-Paleologu
Aluniș
Apostolache
Ariceștii Rahtivani
Ariceștii Zeletin
Baba Ana
Balta Doamnei
Bălțești
Bănești
Bărcănești
Bătrâni
Berceni
Bertea
Blejoi
Boldești-Grădiștea
Brazi
Brebu
Bucov
Călugăreni
Cărbunești
Ceptura
Cerașu
Chiojdeanca
Ciorani
Cocorăștii Mislii
Cocorăștii Colț
Colceag
Cornu
Cosminele
Drăgănești
Drajna
Dumbrava
Dumbrăvești
Filipeștii de Pădure
Filipeștii de Târg
Fântânele
Florești
Fulga
Gherghița
Gorgota
Gornet
Gornet-Cricov
Gura Vadului
Gura Vitioarei
Iordăcheanu
Izvoarele
Jugureni
Lapoș
Lipănești
Măgurele
Măgureni
Măneciu
Mănești
Olari
Păcureți
Păulești
Plopu
Podenii Noi
Poiana Câmpina
Poienarii Burchii
Posești
Predeal-Sărari
Provița de Jos
Provița de Sus
Puchenii Mari
Râfov
Salcia
Sălciile
Scorțeni
Secăria
Sângeru
Șirna
Șoimari
Șotrile
Starchiojd
Ștefești
Surani
Talea
Tătaru
Teișani
Telega
Tinosu
Târgșoru Vechi
Tomșani
Vadu Săpat
Valea Călugărească
Valea Doftanei
Vărbilău
Vâlcănești

Teleorman County
3 municipalities, 2 towns and 92 communes
Municipalities

Alexandria - capital
Roșiorii de Vede
Turnu Măgurele

Towns

Videle
Zimnicea - the southernmost locality in Romania

Communes

Băbăița
Balaci
Beciu
Beuca
Blejești
Bogdana
Botoroaga
Bragadiru
Brânceni
Bujoreni
Bujoru
Buzescu
Călinești
Călmățuiu
Călmățuiu de Sus
Cervenia
Ciolănești
Ciuperceni
Conțești
Cosmești
Crângu
Crevenicu
Crângeni
Didești
Dobrotești
Dracea
Drăcșenei
Drăgănești de Vede
Drăgănești-Vlașca
Fântânele
Frăsinet
Frumoasa
Furculești
Gălăteni
Gratia
Islaz
Izvoarele
Lisa
Lița
Lunca
Măgura
Măldăeni
Mârzănești
Mavrodin
Mereni
Moșteni
Nanov
Năsturelu
Necșești
Nenciulești
Olteni
Orbeasca
Peretu
Piatra
Pietroșani
Plopii-Slăvitești
Plosca
Poeni
Poroschia
Purani
Putineiu
Rădoiești
Răsmirești
Săceni
Saelele
Salcia
Sârbeni
Scrioaștea
Scurtu Mare
Seaca
Segarcea-Vale
Sfințești
Siliștea
Siliștea Gumești
Slobozia Mândra
Smârdioasa
Stejaru
Ștorobăneasa
Suhaia
Talpa
Tătărăștii de Jos
Tătărăștii de Sus
Țigănești
Traian
Trivalea-Moșteni
Troianul
Uda-Clocociov
Vârtoape
Vedea
Viișoara
Vitănești
Zâmbreasca

Greater Bucharest-Ilfov

Bucharest
Municipalities
Bucharest - national capital of Romania

Ilfov County
8 towns and 32 communes
Towns

Bragadiru
Buftea
Chitila
Măgurele
Otopeni
Pantelimon
Popești-Leordeni
Voluntari

Communes

1 Decembrie
Afumați
Balotești
Berceni
Brănești
Cernica
Chiajna
Ciolpani
Ciorogârla
Clinceni
Copăceni, Ilfov
Corbeanca
Cornetu
Dărăști-Ilfov
Dascălu
Dobroești
Domnești
Dragomirești-Vale
Găneasa
Glina
Grădiștea
Gruiu
Jilava
Moara Vlăsiei
Mogoșoaia
Nuci
Periș
Petrăchioaia
Snagov
Ștefăneștii de Jos
Tunari
Vidra

Macroregiunea 4

South-West Romania-Oltenia

Dolj County
3 municipalities, 4 towns and 104 communes
Municipalities

Băilești
Calafat
Craiova - capital

Towns

Bechet
Dăbuleni
Filiași
Segarcea

Communes

Afumați
Almăj
Amărăștii de Jos
Amărăștii de Sus
Apele Vii
Argetoaia
Bârca
Bistreț
Botoșești-Paia
Brabova
Brădești
Braloștița
Bratovoești
Breasta
Bucovăț
Bulzești
Călărași
Calopăr
Caraula
Cârcea
Cârna
Carpen
Castranova
Catane
Celaru
Cerăt
Cernătești
Cetate
Cioroiași
Ciupercenii Noi
Coșoveni
Coțofenii din Dos
Coțofenii din Față
Daneți
Desa
Dioști
Dobrești
Dobrotești
Drăgotești
Drănic
Fărcaș
Galicea Mare
Galiciuica
Gângiova
Ghercești
Ghidici
Ghindeni
Gighera
Giubega
Giurgița
Gogoșu
Goicea
Goiești
Grecești
Întorsura
Ișalnița
Izvoare
Leu
Lipovu
Măceșu de Jos
Măceșu de Sus
Maglavit
Malu Mare
Mârșani
Melinești
Mischii
Moțăței
Murgași
Negoi
Orodel
Ostroveni
Perișor
Pielești
Piscu Vechi
Plenița
Pleșoi
Podari
Poiana Mare
Predești
Radovan
Rast
Robănești
Rojiște
Sadova
Sălcuța
Scăești
Seaca de Câmp
Seaca de Pădure
Secu
Siliștea Crucii
Șimnicu de Sus
Sopot
Tălpaș
Teasc
Terpezița
Teslui
Țuglui
Unirea
Urzicuța
Valea Stanciului
Vârtop
Vârvoru de Jos
Vela
Verbița

Gorj County
2 municipalities, 7 towns and 61 communes
Municipalities

Motru
Târgu Jiu - capital

Towns

Bumbești-Jiu
Novaci
Rovinari
Târgu Cărbunești
Țicleni
Tismana
Turceni

Communes

Albeni
Alimpești
Aninoasa
Arcani
Baia de Fier
Bălănești
Bălești
Bărbătești
Bengești-Ciocadia
Berlești
Bâlteni
Bolboși
Borăscu
Brănești
Bumbești-Pițic
Bustuchin
Câlnic
Căpreni
Cătunele
Ciuperceni
Crasna
Crușeț
Dănciulești
Dănești
Drăgotești
Drăguțești
Fărcășești
Glogova
Godinești
Hurezani
Ionești
Jupânești
Lelești
Licurici
Logrești
Mătăsari
Mușetești
Negomir
Padeș
Peștișani
Plopșoru
Polovragi
Prigoria
Roșia de Amaradia
Runcu
Săcelu
Samarinești
Săulești
Schela
Scoarța
Slivilești
Stănești
Stejari
Stoina
Țânțăreni
Telești
Turburea
Turcinești
Urdari
Văgiulești
Vladimir

Mehedinți County
2 municipalities, 3 towns and 61 communes
Municipalities

Drobeta-Turnu Severin - capital
Orșova

Towns

Baia de Aramă
Strehaia
Vânju Mare

Communes

Bâcleș
Bala
Bălăcița
Balta
Bâlvănești
Braniștea
Breznița-Motru
Breznița-Ocol
Broșteni
Burila Mare
Butoiești
Căzănești
Cireșu
Corcova
Corlățel
Cujmir
Dârvari
Devesel
Dubova
Dumbrava
Eșelnița
Florești
Gârla Mare
Godeanu
Gogoșu
Greci
Grozești
Gruia
Hinova
Husnicioara
Ilovăț
Ilovița
Isverna
Izvoru Bârzii
Jiana
Livezile
Malovăț
Obârșia de Câmp
Obârșia-Cloșani
Oprișor
Pădina Mare
Pătulele
Podeni
Ponoarele
Poroina Mare
Pristol
Prunișor
Punghina
Rogova
Salcia
Șișești
Șimian
Șovarna
Stângăceaua
Svinița
Tâmna
Vânători
Vânjuleț
Vlădaia
Voloiac
Vrata

Olt County
2 municipalities, 6 towns and 104 communes
Municipalities

Caracal
Slatina - capital

Towns

Balș
Corabia
Drăgănești-Olt
Piatra-Olt
Potcoava
Scornicești

Communes

Băbiciu
Baldovinești
Bălteni
Bărăști
Bârza
Bobicești
Brâncoveni
Brastavățu
Brebeni
Bucinișu
Cârlogani
Călui
Cezieni
Cilieni
Colonești
Corbu
Coteana
Crâmpoia
Cungrea
Curtișoara
Dăneasa
Deveselu
Dobrețu
Dobrosloveni
Dobroteasa
Dobrun
Drăghiceni
Făgețelu
Fălcoiu
Fărcașele
Găneasa
Găvănești
Gârcov
Giuvărăști
Ghimpețeni
Gostavățu
Grădinari
Grădinile
Grojdibodu
Gura Padinii
Ianca
Iancu Jianu
Icoana
Ipotești
Izbiceni
Izvoarele
Leleasca
Mărunței
Mihăești
Milcov
Morunglav
Movileni
Nicolae Titulescu
Obârșia
Oboga
Oporelu
Optași-Măgura
Orlea
Osica de Sus
Osica de Jos
Pârșcoveni
Perieți
Pleșoiu
Poboru
Priseaca
Radomirești
Redea
Rotunda
Rusănești
Sâmburești
Sârbii-Măgura
Scărișoara
Schitu
Seaca
Șerbănești
Slătioara
Șopârlița
Spineni
Sprâncenata
Ștefan cel Mare
Stoenești
Stoicănești
Strejești
Studina
Tătulești
Teslui
Tia Mare
Topana
Traian
Tufeni
Urzica
Vădastra
Vădăstrița
Vâlcele
Valea Mare
Văleni
Verguleasa
Vișina
Vișina Nouă
Vitomirești
Vlădila
Voineasa
Vulpeni
Vulturești

Vâlcea County
2 municipalities, 9 towns and 78 communes
Municipalities

Drăgășani
Râmnicu Vâlcea - capital

Towns

Băbeni
Băile Govora
Băile Olănești
Bălcești
Berbești
Brezoi
Călimănești
Horezu
Ocnele Mari

Communes

Alunu
Amărăști
Bărbătești
Berislăvești
Boișoara
Budești
Bujoreni
Bunești
Câineni
Cernișoara
Copăceni
Costești
Crețeni
Dăești
Dănicei
Diculești
Drăgoești
Fârtățești
Făurești
Frâncești
Galicea
Ghioroiu
Glăvile
Golești
Grădiștea
Gușoeni
Ionești
Lăcusteni
Lădești
Laloșu
Lăpușata
Livezi
Lungești
Măciuca
Mădulari
Malaia
Măldărești
Mateești
Mihăești
Milcoiu
Mitrofani
Muereasca
Nicolae Bălcescu
Olanu
Orlești
Oteșani
Păușești
Păușești-Măglași
Perișani
Pesceana
Pietrari
Popești
Prundeni
Racovița
Roești
Roșiile
Runcu
Sălătrucel
Scundu
Sinești
Șirineasa
Slătioara
Stănești
Ștefănești
Stoenești
Stoilești
Stroești
Șușani
Sutești
Tetoiu
Titești
Tomșani
Vaideeni
Valea Mare
Vlădești
Voicești
Voineasa
Zătreni

West Romania

Arad County
1 municipality, 9 towns and 68 communes
Municipalities
Arad - capital
Towns

Chișineu-Criș
Curtici
Ineu
Lipova
Nădlac
Pâncota
Pecica
Sântana
Sebiș

Communes

Almaș
Apateu
Archiș
Bata
Bârsa
Bârzava
Beliu
Birchiș
Bocsig
Brazii
Buteni
Cărand
Cermei
Chisindia
Conop
Covăsânț
Craiva
Dezna
Dieci
Dorobanți
Fântânele
Felnac
Frumușeni
Ghioroc
Grăniceri
Gurahonț
Hălmagiu
Hălmăgel
Hășmaș
Ignești
Iratoșu
Livada
Macea
Mișca
Moneasa
Olari
Păuliș
Peregu Mare
Petriș
Pilu
Pleșcuța
Săvârșin
Secusigiu
Seleuș
Semlac
Sintea Mare
Socodor
Șagu
Șeitin
Șepreuș
Șicula
Șilindia
Șimand
Șiria
Șiștarovăț
Șofronea
Tauț
Târnova
Ususău
Vărădia de Mureș
Vârfurile
Vinga
Vladimirescu
Zăbrani
Zădăreni
Zărand
Zerind
Zimandu Nou

Caraș-Severin County
2 municipalities, 6 towns and 69 communes
Municipalities

Caransebeș
Reșița - capital

Towns

Anina
Băile Herculane
Bocșa
Moldova Nouă
Oravița
Oțelu Roșu

Communes

Armeniș
Bănia
Băuțar
Berliște
Berzasca
Berzovia
Bolvașnița
Bozovici
Brebu
Brebu Nou
Buchin
Bucoșnița
Carașova
Cărbunari
Ciclova Română
Ciuchici
Ciudanovița
Constantin Daicoviciu
Copăcele
Cornea
Cornereva
Coronini
Dalboșeț
Doclin
Dognecea
Domașnea
Eftimie Murgu
Ezeriș
Fârliug
Forotic
Gârnic
Glimboca
Goruia
Grădinari
Iablanița
Lăpușnicel
Lăpușnicu Mare
Luncavița
Lupac
Marga
Măureni
Mehadia
Mehadica
Naidăș
Obreja
Ocna de Fier
Păltiniș
Pojejena
Prigor
Răcășdia
Ramna
Rusca Montană
Sacu
Sasca Montană
Sichevița
Slatina-Timiș
Socol
Șopotu Nou
Târnova
Teregova
Ticvaniu Mare
Topleț
Turnu Ruieni
Văliug
Vărădia
Vermeș
Vrani
Zăvoi
Zorlențu Mare

Hunedoara County
7 municipalities, 7 towns and 55 communes
Municipalities

Brad
Deva - capital
Hunedoara
Lupeni
Orăștie
Petroșani
Vulcan

Towns

Aninoasa
Călan
Geoagiu
Hațeg
Petrila
Simeria
Uricani

Communes

Baia de Criș
Balșa
Bănița
Baru
Băcia
Băița
Bătrâna
Beriu
Blăjeni
Boșorod
Brănișca
Bretea Română
Buceș
Bucureșci
Bulzeștii de Sus
Bunila
Burjuc
Cerbăl
Certeju de Sus
Cârjiți
Crișcior
Densuș
Dobra
General Berthelot
Ghelari
Gurasada
Hărău
Ilia
Lăpugiu de Jos
Lelese
Lunca Cernii de Jos
Luncoiu de Jos
Mărtinești
Orăștioara de Sus
Pestișu Mic
Pui
Rapoltu Mare
Răchitova
Ribița
Râu de Mori
Romos
Sarmizegetusa
Sălașu de Sus
Sântămăria-Orlea
Șoimuș
Teliucu Inferior
Tomești
Toplița
Totești
Turdaș
Vața de Jos
Vălișoara
Vețel
Vorța
Zam

Timiș County
2 municipalities, 8 towns and 89 communes
Municipalities

Lugoj
Timișoara - capital

Towns

Buziaș
Ciacova
Deta
Făget
Gătaia
Jimbolia
Recaș
Sânnicolau Mare

Communes

Balinț
Banloc
Bara
Bârna
Beba Veche
Becicherecu Mic
Belinț
Bethausen
Biled
Birda
Bogda
Boldur
Brestovăț
Bucovăț
Cărpiniș
Cenad
Cenei
Checea
Chevereșu Mare
Comloșu Mare
Coșteiu
Criciova
Curtea
Darova
Denta
Dudeștii Noi
Dudeștii Vechi
Dumbrava
Dumbrăvița
Fârdea
Fibiș
Foeni
Gavojdia
Ghilad
Ghiroda
Ghizela
Giarmata
Giera
Giroc
Giulvăz
Gottlob
Iecea Mare
Jamu Mare
Jebel
Lenauheim
Liebling
Livezile
Lovrin
Margina
Mașloc
Mănăștiur
Moravița
Moșnița Nouă
Nădrag
Nițchidorf
Ohaba Lungă
Orțișoara
Otelec
Parța
Pădureni
Peciu Nou
Periam
Pesac
Pietroasa
Pișchia
Racovița
Remetea Mare
Sacoșu Turcesc
Saravale
Satchinez
Săcălaz
Sânandrei
Sânmihaiu Român
Sânpetru Mare
Secaș
Șag
Șandra
Știuca
Teremia Mare
Tomești
Tomnatic
Topolovățu Mare
Tormac
Traian Vuia
Uivar
Variaș
Vălcani
Victor Vlad Delamarina
Voiteg

See also
Development regions of Romania
Counties of Romania
Cities of Romania
Communes of Romania
Municipalities of Romania

Subdivisions of Romania